Songland is an American songwriting competition series that aired on NBC from May 28, 2019, to June 15, 2020. The show, produced in cooperation with the Universal Television Alternative Studio, 222 Productions, Live Animals Productions and Dave Stewart, sets out to give undiscovered songwriters a chance to create a hit. It gives the viewers a look at the creative process in action. Contestants are selected to work with producers and a recording artist to release a song. The show tries to elevate the traditional role of the songwriter in the process of creating music from "unpleasant secret" to being the celebrated "magic ingredient". Stewart, a musician and composer formerly of Eurythmics, conceived Songland.

The show premiered in May 2019, with three producer-hosts: producer and songwriter Ester Dean; producer and OneRepublic frontman Ryan Tedder; and songwriter Shane McAnally. In September 2019, the series was renewed, and the second season premiered in April 2020.

According to Heavy.com, many of the first season's songs picked by the guest artists for release hit No. 1 on an iTunes chart. Songland was the top new show of summer 2019 "in the key adults 18-49 demographic and among total viewers, according to Nielsen's "most current" metric, which counts a week's worth of delayed viewing per episode where available".

Premise
Each episode, producers Ryan Tedder, Ester Dean and Shane McAnally team up with songwriters to create the next big hit to be recorded by the guest performing artist. Four seemingly unknown songwriters audition songs they have written live for the producers and that episode's guest star(s). They do so in Songlands makeshift recording studio equipped with sound mixing equipment, and sometimes with live musicians and extra singers. They immediately get feedback for the song's lyrics, message, and musical construction, often with specific ways to improve the track. Reviewer Nancy Stetson commented:

From four prospective songs, three are chosen and matched up with one each of the three producers to develop a final version for approval; those re-worked songs are then sung again with one chosen as the winner. The winning track is released the same night as the episode is aired, with the viewers witnessing a song produced for consumption in roughly 45 minutes. It gives the viewers a look at the creative process in action.

Production
Musician and composer David A. Stewart, formerly of Eurythmics, conceived Songland. Songland attempts to rework the often thankless and grueling job of songwriting. The general public rarely notes who wrote the lyrics, or the music that catches attention, instead the credit is generally given to the singer, the typical narrative being that they're anonymous "cogs in the well-oiled pop (music) machine". A song is optioned, sometimes passed to other artists, who may wait months or years to record it, or just a hook from it, and all for the singer's own glory. The show tries to elevate the traditional role of the songwriter in the process of creating music from "unpleasant secret" to being the celebrated "magic ingredient".

The show premiered in May 2019, with three producer-hosts: producer and songwriter Ester Dean; producer and lead singer of OneRepublic Ryan Tedder; and songwriter Shane McAnally. In 2016, an entertainment lawyer advised prospective songwriters from signing the show's contract as they would be giving it the rights to their work whether chosen or not. The show responded, "We wish to be abundantly clear that by signing the casting application, songwriters do not transfer ownership of any of their original songs. This show is truly a celebration of songwriters and their craft."

Episodes
Color key:

Season 1 (2019)

Episode 1 (May 28, 2019)
 Musical guest: John Legend

Notes: John Legend chose the song from Bahamian-born and Miami-based Tebby Burrows because he felt that, of the four songs, it had "the biggest journey from where it was to where it is now." "We Need Love" hit No. 1 on the iTunes R&B chart.

Episode 2 (June 4, 2019)
 Musical guest: will.i.am

Notes: will.i.am opted to record all three finalist songs; at the end of the episode he announced that he would remove three songs from Black Eyed Peas' next album Translation (2020), to add "Be Nice", as well as "Boxes" and "Invincible". He also told fourth place Ray Goren that "Oh Lord" is "a career-making song he should record for himself", and that he would be a featured singer on Goren's track. "Be Nice" hit No. 1 on the iTunes Rock Charts.

Episode 3 (June 11, 2019)
 Musical guest: Kelsea Ballerini

Notes:  Kelsea Ballerini is the first country music artist on the show, and said that she is attracted to songs that provoke a strong reaction in her, whether that reaction is dancing or crying. She added that Darius Coleman had created a country hook whether he intended to or not. "Better Luck Next Time" charted No. 1 on the iTunes Pop Chart, and No. 2 on the iTunes Overall Charts.

Episode 4 (June 18, 2019)
 Musical guest: Jonas Brothers

Notes: Philadelphia songwriter and beatmaker Able Heart has been a ghost-writer up until the show; he also had never sung live. The Jonas Brothers' "Greenlight" went to #1 on the U.S. iTunes sales charts, and hit No. 1 on the iTunes Overall Charts.

Episode 5 (June 25, 2019)
 Musical guest: Meghan Trainor

Notes: Trainor picked the song because of its lyrics "about the aftermath of a breakup and making sure you always rise above the drama" being empowering. "Hurt Me" is "a fun and sassy dance-pop cut" with "a hooky jam".

Episode 6 (July 2, 2019)
 Musical guest: Aloe Blacc

Notes: The winning song, "Getting Started" by Kyle Williams aka producer Willyecho, was used for the Fast & Furious spin-off Hobbs & Shaw (August 2019) directed by David Leitch, who helped decide on the song which features rapper JID. They were looking for a “song that is motivational and inspiring with swagger”. Aloe Blacc also chose to record "Same Blood" by Steve Fee. "Chosen", the fourth-place finisher from Afika, was also released. TVTE's "Call for a Hero" was retitled "Hero" for the official version.

Episode 7 (August 14, 2019)
 Musical guest: Macklemore

Notes: Macklemore released the single "Shadow" as a collaboration with Iro, it reached No. 1 on the iTunes Hip-Hop/Rap Chart.

Episode 8 (August 21, 2019)
 Musical guest: Old Dominion

Notes: The winning song "Young" is featured on Jeep commercial. Katelyn Tarver, the winning songwriter, also starred in the commercial.

Episode 9 (August 28, 2019)
 Musical guest: Leona Lewis

Notes: "Solo Quiero (Somebody to Love)" by Leona Lewis, Cali y El Dandee and Juan Magán reached No. 1 on the iTunes Latino chart. The song has also peaked at number one on several US Billboard Latin charts, including the Latin Digital Song Sales.

Episode 10 (September 4, 2019)
 Musical guest: Charlie Puth

Notes: Even though Charlie Puth picked Zach Sorgen's song "Bad Habit", he did not release a version instead opting to give the song back to Sorgen to release himself.

Episode 11 (September 11, 2019)
 Musical guest: OneRepublic

With Tedder serving as the musical guest, Jason Evigan served as a guest producer.

Notes: OneRepublic's "Somebody to Love" went to #1 on the U.S. iTunes sales charts, two days after the official release. The song was included on the group's album Human (2021), as the promotional single.

Winning Producers (Season 1)

Season 2 (2020)

Episode 1 (April 13, 2020)
 Musical guest: Lady Antebellum

Notes: 
 "Champagne Night" hit the number one spot on the US iTunes sales chart, and remained in the top ten the following week. 
 "Long Way Home", written by Ryan Innes, was later chosen as an original song for The Voice winner Todd Tilghman during the season 18 finale, with Shane McAnally and Ester Dean co-producing. The song also reached the number one spot on the US iTunes sales chart upon its release. "Long Way Home" eventually became Tilghman's coronation song following his victory the day after its release.

Episode 2 (April 20, 2020)
 Musical guest: Luis Fonsi

Notes: “Sway” hit the number one spot on the US iTunes sales chart. Season 1 contestant IRO returned to provide vocals on Dyson's "Lost In Translation" for the final presentation phase.
Luis Fonsi became the first Puerto Rico singer-songwriter on the show.

Episode 3 (April 27, 2020)
 Musical guest: H.E.R.

Episode 4 (May 4, 2020)
 Musical guest: Martina McBride

Episode 5 (May 11, 2020)
 Musical guest: Julia Michaels

Episode 6 (May 18, 2020)
 Musical guest: Florida Georgia Line

Episode 7 (May 25, 2020)
 Musical guest: Boyz II Men

Notes: Boyz II Men opted to record all three finalist songs.

Episode 8 (June 1, 2020)
 Musical guest: Bebe Rexha

Notes: In a first for the series, Rexha combined "Miracle" by Scott and "Bones" by Graceman for the winning song that was set be used to promote the 2020 Summer Olympics before it was replaced with "Remember This" by Jonas Brothers. Season 1 contestant Sam DeRosa returned to provide vocals on Scott's "Miracle" for the final presentation phase.

Episode 9 (June 8, 2020)
 Musical guest: Ben Platt

Episode 10 (June 15, 2020)
 Musical guest: Usher

Winning Producers (Season 2)

The Voice 2020 finale crossover
For the finale of The Voice, Songland songwriters and producers Shane McAnally, Ester Dean, and Ryan Tedder were recruited to help each of the five finalists with original songs. The contestants, because of the COVID-19 pandemic, consulted and performed remotely.

Notes: Todd Tilghman from Team Blake Shelton became the first and the only contestant of the eighteenth season to reach top ten on iTunes. His original song's studio recording hit #1 on iTunes Overall Chart and iTunes Country Chart.

List of songs premiered on Songland
This is a list of songs that appeared on the show that have been released by the guest artists, or through the songwriters. Sounds Like Nashville noted, “All of the songs from Songland are available digitally for purchase or streaming”.

Artists' appearances on other television shows 
 Sam James was a contestant on the third season of The Voice, but was eliminated in the Knockout Rounds.
 Josh Logan was a contestant on season five of The Voice, but was eliminated in the Live Shows.
 Katelyn Tarver was a contestant on American Juniors. She is also known for her recurring role as Jo Taylor on Big Time Rush.
 Joel Adams previously competed on season four of The X Factor Australia, but was eliminated during the bootcamp round.
 Tim Halperin was a contestant on season ten of American Idol, but was eliminated in the Top 24.
 Ryan Innes was a contestant on season four of The Voice, but was eliminated in the Knockout Rounds.
 Raquel Castro was a contestant on the first season of The Voice, but was eliminated in the Live Shows.
 Anna Graceman was a finalist on season six of America's Got Talent.
 Kylie Rothfield was a contestant on season eleven of The Voice, but was eliminated during the Live Playoffs.
 Halie would later compete on the first season of American Song Contest, representing Missouri.

Ratings

Season 1

Season 2

International adaptations
Songland Thailand premiered on TrueID on October 20, 2020. It is produced by GMM Grammy and Online Creator Club.

References

External links
 Official website
 

2010s American reality television series
2010s American music television series
2020s American reality television series
2020s American music television series
2019 American television series debuts
2020 American television series endings
Music competitions in the United States
NBC original programming
Television series by Universal Television
Television series created by David A. Stewart